Alind Shriniwas Naidu (born 11 October 1983 in Yavatmal, Maharashtra) is an Indian cricketer who plays for Mumbai. He is right-hand batsman who can bowls right-arm offbreak balls.

References

External links
 

1983 births
Living people
Indian cricketers
Vidarbha cricketers
People from Yavatmal